In mathematics, the conductor-discriminant formula or Führerdiskriminantenproduktformel, introduced by  for abelian extensions and by   for Galois extensions,  is a formula calculating the relative discriminant of a finite Galois extension  of local or global fields from the Artin conductors of the irreducible characters  of the Galois group .

Statement 
Let  be a finite Galois extension of global fields with Galois group . Then the discriminant equals

 

Example 
Let  be a cyclotomic extension of the rationals. The Galois group  equals . Because  is the only finite prime ramified, the global Artin conductor  equals the local one . Because  is abelian, every non-trivial irreducible character  is of degree . , where  is the smallest natural number such that .

Notes

References 

 

Algebraic number theory